7 Arietis is a binary star system in the northern constellation of Aries. 7 Arietis is the Flamsteed designation. The pair have a combined apparent visual magnitude of 5.76, making it faintly visible to the naked eye from dark suburban skies. Based upon an annual parallax shift of 5.39 mas, it is approximately  distant from the Earth, give or take a 30 light-year margin of error. It is drifting further away from the Sun with a radial velocity of +16 km/s.

This is listed as an eclipsing binary system with a period of 47.9 days and has the variable star designation RR Arietis. During each eclipse of the primary star, the magnitude of the system decreases by 0.40. The eclipse of the secondary reduces the magnitude by 0.35. The primary component of the system is an evolved giant star with a stellar classification of K1 III. It is about 25 times the size of the Sun and is radiating 231 times the Sun's luminosity from its photosphere at an eeffective temperature of 4,500 K. 

The eclipsing binary nature of this star has been disputed by Italian astronomer Ennio Poretti. Observations made as part of the British Astronomical Association eclipsing binaries program by Tristram Brelstaff were also unable to confirm eclipses.

References

External links
 HR 559
 Image 7 Arietis

K-type giants
Eclipsing binaries
Aries (constellation)
Durchmusterung objects
Arietis, 07
011763
008993
0559
Arietis, RR